Brian Milton Bullivant (10 February 1927 – 24 November 2013) was a British sprint canoer who competed in the late 1950s. At the 1956 Summer Olympics in Melbourne, he finished eighth in the K-2 10000 m event and ninth in the K-2 10000 m event.

References
Brian Bullivant's profile at Sports Reference.com
Brian Bullivant's obituary

1927 births
2013 deaths
Canoeists at the 1956 Summer Olympics
Olympic canoeists of Great Britain
British male canoeists